Wingfield Bullock (1766October 13, 1821) was a U.S. Representative from Kentucky.

Born in 1766 in Spotsylvania, Virginia, Bullock studied law.
He moved to Kentucky.
He served as member of the Kentucky Senate from Shelby County from 1812 to 1814.

Bullock was elected as a Democratic-Republican to the Seventeenth Congress (March 4, 1821 – October 13, 1821).
He died on October 13, 1821, in Shelbyville, Kentucky.
He was interred in an old burying ground near Shelbyville.

See also
List of United States Congress members who died in office (1790–1899)

References

1766 births
1821 deaths
Democratic-Republican Party members of the United States House of Representatives from Kentucky
Kentucky state senators
Burials in Kentucky
19th-century American politicians